Elaine Willcox is an English television reporter. Currently employed by ITV Granada.

Media career
Elaine was part of a team which won a BAFTA in 2007 for covering the impact of the Morecambe Bay cockling disaster for ITV Granada.  This, to date, is the only occasion where a BAFTA has gone to a regional news programme.

In September 2007 she joined GMTV as North West England Correspondent, after three years, she returned to ITV Granada as a reporter for regional news programme Granada Reports.

References

External links
BAFTA win

GMTV presenters and reporters
ITV regional newsreaders and journalists
Living people
Year of birth missing (living people)